Quebracho is a hamlet in Cerro Largo Department in Uruguay. It is the head of the Municipality of Quebracho.

Location
Quebracho is located in the center-west part of the department of Cerro Largo, on the Tupambaé blade, near the shores of the Coimbra Stream.

Population
In 2011, Quebracho had a population of 70.
 
Source: Instituto Nacional de Estadística de Uruguay

References

Populated places in the Cerro Largo Department